John Benjamin Russell (1834–1894), known in his earlier life as John Russell and later as J. B. Russell, was a New Zealand lawyer, businessman and landscape gardener. He was born in Maitland, New South Wales, Australia in 1834.

References

1834 births
1894 deaths
New Zealand businesspeople
Australian emigrants to New Zealand
19th-century New Zealand lawyers
New Zealand gardeners